730 Park Avenue is a historic residential building in Lenox Hill on the Upper East Side of Manhattan in New York City, USA. A cooperative, the building has 38 apartments.

History
The nineteen-story building was completed in 1929. It is 68.58 metre high. It was designed by architect Lafayette A. Goldstone.

Past tenants included Samuel Irving Newhouse, Sr. (the founder of Advance Publications) and his wife Mitzi, philanthropist Edward Warburg, John Langeloth Loeb, Jr. (who served as the United States Ambassador to Denmark from 1981 to 1983), Lyman G. Bloomingdale (the co-founder of Bloomingdale's) and journalist Mike Wallace of 60 Minutes.

References

Residential buildings completed in 1929
Condominiums and housing cooperatives in Manhattan
Upper East Side
Park Avenue